The Vanguarda Armada Revolucionária Palmares (VAR Palmares) was a far left guerrilla organization in Brazil, which fought against the military dictatorship installed after the 1964 coup d'état in the country with the objective to implant a communist dictatorship. The organization was named after Palmares, a legendary quilombo destroyed by Portuguese artillery in 1694. It was created in July 1969, as a result of the merger between Comando de Libertação Nacional (Colina) and Vanguarda Popular Revolucionária (VPR), led by anti-dictatorship Army Captain Carlos Lamarca.

As historian and former MR-8 militant  declared to journalist Elio Gaspari, "as part of the radicalization process initiated on 1961, the project of the leftist organizations that supported the armed struggle was revolutionary, abusive and dictatorial (...) There is not even one document of those organizations in which they present themselves as a tool of democratic resistance".

The organization carried out acts of robbery, theft and terrorist bombing. The best known of them is the expropriation of the mythical "Adhemar de Barros' safe box", which contained over 2.8 million dollars in cash, equivalent to 16.2 million dollars in 2007. The safe was in the residence of Anna Gimel Benchimol Capriglione, secretary and mistress of the former governor of São Paulo, who was popularly known by his supporters' catchphrase "he steals but he gets things done". The militants assumed that the money kept in the safe would be the product of corruption. Carlos Minc was one of the members of VAR Palmares which participated in the robbery. Dilma Rousseff was also a member, but she claims not to have taken part in the group's most famous transgression. While some versions state that Dilma organized the whole operation, Minc and other members of the group assure that she had no major role in the VAR Palmares.

On September 1969, one of its splinter groups recreated the VPR and another faction created the DVP, later renamed Unit Group. Also in 1969, VAR Palmares members planned the kidnapping of Finance Minister Antônio Delfim Netto, planner of the "Brazilian economic miracle" and the most powerful civilian in the regime at that time. The alleged kidnapping was to occur in December of that year, but was not accomplished because most VAR Palmares members were captured and jailed just weeks before.

VAR Palmares was dismantled in 1971 due to strong repression from the military. Two of its main leaders were imprisoned and murdered by the regime: , one of Colina's founders, and Joaquim da Mariano Silva, a veteran member of the Peasant Leagues, who "disappeared" in the DOI-CODI jail in Rio de Janeiro.

Notes
This article incorporates material translated from the corresponding article in the Portuguese language Wikipedia.

References

Guerrilla movements in Latin America
Military history of Brazil
Military units and formations established in 1969
Military units and formations disestablished in 1971
Paramilitary organisations based in Brazil